With a Little Help from My Friends is the debut album by singer-songwriter Joe Cocker, released in late April 1969. It was certified gold in the US and peaked at number 35 on the Billboard 200. In the UK, the album charted in May 1972 at number 29 when it was re-released as a double pack with Cocker's second LP Joe Cocker!.

The title track was written by John Lennon and Paul McCartney and originally performed by the Beatles on the album Sgt. Pepper's Lonely Hearts Club Band; it has been inducted into both the Grammy Award Hall of Fame and the Rock and Roll Hall of Fame. Cocker's version was the theme song to the television series The Wonder Years during the 1980s and 1990s.

In 2015, the Audio Fidelity company released a limited reissue of the album in hybrid SACD format as a tribute to Cocker.

Reception

With a Little Help from My Friends met with a favourable review from Rolling Stone'''s John Mendelsohn. Mendelsohn stated that "Cocker has assimilated the [Ray] Charles influence to the point where his feeling for what he is singing cannot really be questioned. And, in answer to the question of why someone should listen to Cocker when there is Charles to listen to – how many times in recent years has the latter applied himself to such exceptional modern material [...] or such contemporary Dylan... ?" He also stated that "Cordell's success in fusing a consistently marvelous backing unit out of America's premier studio soul singers and England's most famous rock musicians and delicate egos cannot be exaggerated." He concluded that "it's a triumph all around. And the thought of Cocker's next album [...] is an exceptionally pleasant one." In The New York Times'', Robert Christgau wrote:

A retrospective review from Allmusic's Bruce Eder was fairly positive. Eder stated that the album "holds up extraordinarily well across four decades, the singer's performance bolstered by some very sharp playing, [...] It's Cocker's voice, a soulful rasp of an instrument [...] that carries this album and makes "Change in Louise," "Feeling Alright," "Just Like a Woman," "I Shall Be Released," and even "Bye Bye Blackbird" into profound listening experiences." He concluded that "the surprises in the arrangements, tempo, and approaches taken help make this an exceptional album. Tracks like "Just Like a Woman," with its soaring gospel organ above a lean textured acoustic and light electric accompaniment, and the guitar-dominated rendition of "Don't Let Me Be Misunderstood" [...] all help make this an exceptional listening experience."

Track listing

Note: the timings on the album sleeve (and reissues) have 3 tracks incorrect by about 1 minute: Marjorine (3:38), With a Little Help from My Friends (4:05) and I Shall Be Released (3:38). The above timings are correct.

Personnel
Joe Cocker – vocals
David Bennett Cohen – guitar (track 1)
Tony Visconti – guitar (track 2)
Jimmy Page – guitar (tracks 2, 4, 5, 7 & 9)
Henry McCullough – guitar (tracks 3, 6, 8 & 10)
Albert Lee – guitar (track 4)
Chris Stainton – piano (tracks 2, 3, 4 & 7), organ (tracks 2 & 7), bass guitar (tracks 2-10)
Tommy Eyre – piano (track 5), organ (tracks 8 & 9)
Artie Butler – piano (track 1)
Matthew Fisher – organ (track 5)
Steve Winwood – organ (tracks 6 & 10)
Carol Kaye – bass guitar (track 1)
Paul Humphrey – drums (track 1)
Clem Cattini – drums (tracks 2, 4 & 7)
Mike Kellie – drums (tracks 3, 6 & 10)
B. J. Wilson – drums (tracks 5 & 9)
Kenny Slade – drums (track 8)
Laudir de Oliveira – tumba, congas, maracas (track 1)
Brenda Holloway – backing vocals (track 1)
Patrice Holloway – backing vocals (track 1)
Merry Clayton – backing vocals (track 1)
Madeline Bell – backing vocals (tracks 2, 6 & 9)
Rosetta Hightower – backing vocals (tracks 2 & 9)
Sue Wheetman – backing vocals (tracks 3, 6, 9 & 10)
Sunny Wheetman – backing vocals (tracks 3, 6, 9 & 10)
Nick Harrison - string arrangement (track 10)

Production 
Denny Cordell - producer
Tony Visconti - mixing engineer
Tom Wilkes - album design
Martin Keeley - front cover photography
Eric Hays - back cover photography
Herb Greene - back cover photography

Chart performance

Certifications

References

1969 debut albums
Joe Cocker albums
Albums produced by Denny Cordell
Regal Zonophone Records albums
A&M Records albums
Stateside Records albums
Polydor Records albums
Albums recorded at Trident Studios
Albums recorded at Olympic Sound Studios